Popstar is a 2005 American film directed by Richard Gabai and written by Timothy Barton. The direct-to-video film features singer Aaron Carter in his only lead role in a feature film. The premiere was held in The Woodlands, Texas. Popstar was filmed in Calabasas, California, at A.C. Stelle Middle School and the Commons.

Plot
Jane Brighton (Alana Austin) is a high school math whiz obsessed with J.D. McQueen (Aaron Carter), a teen music sensation whose parents have sent him back to public high school to improve his declining grades. J.D. risks missing a critical summer tour that could ruin his musical career. To get help with math, he builds a relationship with Jane.

Cast
 Aaron Carter as J.D. McQueen
 Alana Austin as Jane Brighton
 Nicki Foxx as London
 David Cassidy as Grant
 Kimberly Kevon Williams as Abby Banks
 Adrianne Palicki as Whitney Addison
 Mary Elise Hayden as Bobette
 Deena Dill as Faith Brighton
 Andrew Stevens as Professor Brighton
 Natalia Livingston as Mary Brighton
 Leif Garrett as Janitor
 Tracy Scoggins as Judy McQueen
 Vanessa Angel as Diane
 Rachel Thorp as Samantha Brighton
 Rick Thomas as Mr. Overton

Former 1970s teen idols David Cassidy and Leif Garrett appear in supporting roles as J.D.'s manager and a philosophical janitor.  Other famous actors appearing in the film are Andrew Stevens, Tracy Scoggins, Natalia Livingston, Tom Bosley and Stella Stevens.  Former Backstreet Boys and NSYNC manager, Lou Pearlman appears in an uncredited cameo at the end of the film.

Soundtrack
The Popstar soundtrack was released October 18, 2005, and features Carter in "Saturday Night" (live), "Enuff Of Me", "I Want Candy" (live), "One Better" (live), and "Do You Remember" (live).

External links 
 
 
 

2005 direct-to-video films
2005 films
American teen films
American teen comedy films
American teen romance films
2005 romantic comedy films
Films about music and musicians
2000s English-language films
Films directed by Richard Gabai
2000s American films